Kim Fu (born 1987) is a Canadian-born writer, living in Seattle, Washington. She was born in Vancouver, British Columbia to immigrant parents from Hong Kong, Fu studied creative writing at the University of British Columbia.

Her first novel For Today I Am a Boy won the Edmund White Award for Debut Fiction and was a finalist for the PEN/Hemingway Award. It was also a New York Times Book Review Editors' Choice and long-listed for CBC's Canada Reads. Fu's debut poetry collection How Festive the Ambulance received a starred review from Publishers Weekly, and includes a 2017 National Magazine Awards Silver Medal winner and a Best Canadian Poetry 2016 selection.

Fu's writing has appeared in Granta, the Atlantic, the New York Times, Hazlitt, and the Times Literary Supplement. She has received residency fellowships from the Ucross Foundation, Berton House, Wildacres, and the Wallace Stegner Grant for the Arts.

Her second novel, The Lost Girls of Camp Forevermore, was published in 2018. Her short story collection Lesser Known Monsters of the 21st Century was published in 2022.

Published works

References

External links
 

1987 births
Canadian women novelists
Canadian women poets
Writers from Vancouver
University of British Columbia alumni
21st-century Canadian novelists
21st-century Canadian poets
Canadian writers of Asian descent
Living people
Canadian people of Hong Kong descent
21st-century Canadian women writers
21st-century Canadian essayists
Canadian women essayists